Senator Comerford may refer to:

Frank D. Comerford (1879–1929), Illinois State Senate
Jo Comerford (fl. 2010s), Massachusetts State Senate